New York’s 28th congressional district is an obsolete congressional district for the United States House of Representatives. Before becoming obsolete in 2013, the district was based in Rochester, Buffalo, and Niagara Falls, and included parts of Erie, Monroe, Niagara and Orleans Counties. Its easternmost point was in Fairport at the home of its final representative, Democrat Louise Slaughter. Due to its gerrymandered shape it was sometimes known as "the earmuffs."

After congressional district lines were redrawn to accommodate the loss of the seat due to reapportionment as a result of the 2010 Census, the "earmuffs" were dismantled. The western portion of the present 28th district became part of the new 27th district and the eastern portion of the 28th comprised the majority of the new 25th district, which is contained entirely in Monroe County.

Voting

History
2003–2013:
Parts of Erie, Monroe, Niagara, Orleans
1993–2003:
Parts of Monroe
1983–1993:
All of Broome, Tioga, Ulster
Parts of Delaware, Sullivan, Tompkins
1973–1983:
Parts of Albany, Montgomery, Schenectady
1971–1973:
All of Columbia, Delaware, Greene, Otsego, Schoharie, Ulster
Parts of Duchess, Montgomery, Sullivan
1963–1971:
All of Columbia, Duchess, Greene, Schoharie, Ulster
1953–1963:
All of Delaware, Orange, Rockland, Sullivan
1945–1953:
Parts of Westchester
1913–1945:
All of Albany
Parts of Rensselaer

List of members representing the district

The 28th District has included all or part of Rochester since 1992. The 2002 remap added parts of Buffalo and Niagara Falls.  In the 1980s the 28th District was the southern tier seat now numbered the 22nd District. In the 1970s it was the Capitol District seat now numbered the 21st District. During the 1960s it was a Hudson Valley/Catskill seat including much of the present 19th District and parts of the 20th and 22nd District.

Prior to 1992 the Rochester area district was the 30th. Monroe County was split between two districts in the 1970s, the 34th District (which included much of the present 25th District) and the 35th District (which included much of the present 26th District).

Election results 
Note that in New York State electoral politics there are numerous minor parties at various points on the political spectrum. Certain parties will invariably endorse either the Republican or Democratic candidate for every office, hence the state electoral results contain both the party votes, and the final candidate votes (Listed as "Recap").

See also 

 2012 added
 
 
 
 
 
 
 
 
 
 
 
 
 2012 eliminated

References 

 Congressional Biographical Directory of the United States 1774–present
 2004 House election data Clerk of the House of Representatives
 2002 House election data "
 2000 House election data "
 1998 House election data "
 1996 House election data "

28
Erie County, New York
Monroe County, New York
Niagara County, New York
Orleans County, New York
Former congressional districts of the United States
Constituencies established in 1823
Constituencies disestablished in 2013
1823 establishments in New York (state)
2013 disestablishments in New York (state)
Government of Buffalo, New York